The 2006 Taça de Angola was the 25th edition of the Taça de Angola, the second most important and the top knock-out football club competition following the Girabola. 

Benfica de Luanda, the runner-up, qualified to the CAF Confederation Cup since Primeiro de Agosto, the winner, contested the CAF Champions League in their capacity as the Girabola winner.

Stadiums and locations

Championship bracket
The knockout rounds were played according to the following schedule:
 Jun 11: preliminary rounds
 Sep 3 - 27: Round of 16
 Oct 5 - 11: Quarter-finals
 Nov 7/8: Semi-finals
 Nov 11: Final

1/16 finals

Quarter-finals

Semi-finals

Final

See also
 2006 Girabola
 2007 Angola Super Cup
 2007 CAF Confederation Cup
 Primeiro de Agosto players
 Benfica de Luanda players

External links
 profile at rsssf.com

References

Angola Cup
2006 in Angolan football
Angola